Kevin Giovesi (born 8 November 1993) is an Italian racing driver. He is the 2012 European F3 Open Copa Class champion.

Career

Karting
Born in Rho, Giovesi began karting in 2005 and raced primarily in his native Italy for the majority of this part of career, working his way up from the junior ranks to progress through to the KF3 category by 2008.

Formula Lista Junior
In 2009, Giovesi graduated to single–seaters into the Formula Lista Junior series, competing with Daltec Racing. He won races at Nürburgring, Magny-Cours and Hockenheimring with four another podium finishes on his way to the championship title.

Italian Formula Three
Giovesi stepped up to Italian Formula Three Championship, joining BVM – Target Racing, ut after the first round he switched to JD Motorsport. He finished half of the season races in points. This brought him fifteenth place in the championship.

Giovesi remain in Italian championship in 2011 but moved to Lucidi Motors team. He progressed to the seventh place in the championship standings.

After skipping first three rounds in 2012, Giovesi returned in the championship, participating with Ghinzani Arco Motorsport. He finished sixth in the European Series and fourth in the Italian Series.

European F3 Open
In 2012, Giovesi decided to race in Copa Class of the European F3 Open Championship for the Dallara F308 cars with DAV Racing. He finished sixth in the main class and won the Copa Class.

Formula Renault
Giovesi had single appearances in Eurocup Formula Renault 2.0 and in Formula Renault Northern European Cup 2012 with EPIC Racing and Daltec Racing.

GP2 Series
Giovesi made his GP2 Series switch in 2013, joining Venezuela GP Lazarus.

Racing record

Career summary

Complete GP2 Series results
(key) (Races in bold indicate pole position) (Races in italics indicate fastest lap)

Complete Auto GP results
(key) (Races in bold indicate pole position) (Races in italics indicate fastest lap)

† Driver did not finish the race, but was classified as he completed over 90% of the race distance.

References

External links
 
 
 

1993 births
Living people
People from Rho, Lombardy
Italian racing drivers
Formula Lista Junior drivers
Italian Formula Three Championship drivers
Formula Renault Eurocup drivers
Formula Renault 2.0 NEC drivers
Euroformula Open Championship drivers
GP2 Series drivers
Auto GP drivers
Sportspeople from the Metropolitan City of Milan
EPIC Racing drivers
BVM Target drivers
JD Motorsport drivers
Team Lazarus drivers
Rapax Team drivers